The Archer Grand Prix was part of the British Cycling Premier Calendar.

History 
The Archer Grand Prix was run annually for over fifty years, organised by Stuart Benstead of the Archer Road Club (although Stuart Cook organised the last two events in 2006 and 2007). It was described by British Cycling as a "long running classic". The first edition was held in 1956 and won by British rider, Alfred Howling. 1968 saw the first non-British winner when Jan Krekels of the Netherlands won the race. The race has in the past, adopted the name of its main sponsor, including Harp, Pernod and Cycling Weekly.

Consistently routed around the roads and lanes of the Chiltern Hills, the most recent route was split into a large and small circuit.  The large circuit took in Whiteleaf Hill and Hughenden Valley while the small finish circuit included the finish at Winchmoor Hill.

The 2007 edition was won by Simon Gaywood riding for the Plowman Craven Associates team from Matt Talbot (Rapha Condor) and Andy Roche (Pinarello). The 53rd version of the race was scheduled to run in Spring 2008 but had to be cancelled because of policing issues. The future of the race then became uncertain; it was scheduled to be held again on 19 April 2009, but sponsorship problems led to a second cancellation.

Winners

References

Cycle races in England
Recurring sporting events established in 1956
Men's road bicycle races
1956 establishments in England
UCI Europe Tour races
Recurring sporting events disestablished in 2007
2007 disestablishments in England
Defunct cycling races in the United Kingdom